This is a list of Esteghlal F.C.'s results for the  2007–08 Season. The club is competing in the Iranian Premier League and Hazfi Cup.

Squad 

Last updated Friday, March 11, 2008

Transfers 

In:

Out:

Persian Gulf Cup

Classification

Summary of results

Hazfi Cup

Goalscorers

Assists 

Last updated Friday, November 21, 2010

References 

 Iran Pro League Statistics
 Persian League

2007-08
Iranian football clubs 2007–08 season